Markus Hediger (born 31 March 1959) is a Swiss writer and translator.

Life
Markus Hediger was born in Zürich and brought up in Reinach, Aargau. From 1980 to 1990 he studied French literature, literary criticism and Italian literature at University of Zurich.

At the age of 16 he went to Paris for the first time. In 1979 he met there the Lebanese poet and playwright Georges Schehadé who opened to him new poetical horizons and whom he visited regularly until his death in 1989. In Switzerland he became friends with the writers Erika Burkart, Hugo Loetscher, Alice Rivaz and Walter Vogt.

In 1996 Markus Hediger published his first book of poetry, Ne retournez pas la pierre. This was followed by En deçà de la lumière in 2009 and Dans le cendrier du temps in 2022.

In 2011 he was invited to the International Poetry Festival of Rosario (Argentina), in 2014 to the International Poetry Festival of Medellín (Colombia) and in 2016 to the International Poetry Festival of Lima.

Works

Poetry

 Ne retournez pas la pierre, romésie (1981–1995), Éditions de l'Aire, Vevey 1996 
 Ne retournez pas la pierre – Dreht den Stein nicht um, Français – Deutsch (Audio CD), German translation by Yla Margrit von Dach, Arsmedia, Schöftland 1999 
 Là pour me souvenir / Qui per ricordare (traduzione di Alberto Panaro e Grazia Regoli), selection of 17 poems in French and Italian translation. Lietocollelibiri, Faloppio 2005 
 En deçà de la lumière, romésie II (1996–2007), Éditions de l'Aire, Vevey 2009 
 Pour que quelqu'un de vous se souvienne (2008-2013), Alla Chiara Fonte, Viganello Lugano 2013
 L'or et l'ombre. Un seul corps, romésies I-III (1981-2016), foreword by René de Ceccatty, Éditions de l'Aire, L'Aire bleue, Vevey 2017 
 Dans le cendrier du temps, romésie III (2008-2021), Éditions de l'Aire, L'Aire bleue, Vevey 2022

Essay
 Les Après-midi de Georges Schehadé, in: Rencontre II, Éditions de l'Aire, Vevey 2009,

Anthology 
 Passagen – Erzählungen aus der französischen Schweiz 1970–1990. Benziger Verlag, Zürich 1991

Translations 
 Jacques Mercanton: Der Verbannte von Grado (fr. La Sibylle). Italian short stories. Benziger, Zürich 1984
 Étienne Barilier: Die Katze Musica (fr. Musique). Novel. Benziger, Zürich 1991
 Bernard Comment: Diener des Wissens (fr. L’Ombre de mémoire). Novel. Benziger, Zürich 1992
 Alice Rivaz: Wolken in der Hand (fr. Nuages dans la main). Novel. Huber, Frauenfeld 1992
 Jacques Mercanton: Die Stunden des James Joyce (fr. Les Heures de James Joyce). Essay. Lenos, Basel 1993
 Yves Laplace: Ein vorbildlicher Mann (fr. Un Homme exemplaire). Novel. Lenos, Basel 1994
 Alice Rivaz: Schlaflose Nacht (fr. Jette ton pain). Novel. Lenos, Basel 1994
 Jacques-Étienne Bovard: Warum rauchen Sie, Monsieur Grin? (fr. La Griffe). Novel. Lenos, Basel 1996
 Élisabeth Horem: Der Ring (fr. Le Ring). Novel. Lenos Verlag, Basel 1996
 Yvette Z’Graggen: Matthias Berg (fr. Matthias Berg). Novel. Lenos, Basel 1997
 Alice Rivaz: Aus dem Gedächtnis, aus dem Vergessen (fr. De Mémoire et d’oubli). Short stories. Lenos, Basel 1997
 Yvette Z’Graggen: La Punta (fr. La Punta). Novel. Lenos, Basel 1999
 Alice Rivaz: Wie Sand durch die Finger (fr. Comme le sable). Novel. Lenos, Basel 2000
 Alice Rivaz: Das Wellental (fr. Le Creux de la vague). Novel. Lenos, Basel 2001
 Rose-Marie Pagnard: Judiths Vermächtnis (fr. La Leçon de Judith). Short story. Lenos, Basel 2002
 Jean-Bernard Vuillème: Mit dem Gesicht zum Rücken (fr. Face à dos). Novel. Lenos, Basel 2003
 Yvette Z’Graggen: Die Hügel (fr. Les Collines). Short story. Lenos, Basel 2004
 Nicolas Bouvier: Aussen und innen (fr. Le Dehors et le dedans). Poems. Lenos, Basel 2005
 Yvette Z'Graggen: Weiher unter Eis (fr. Un Etang sous la glace). Novel. Lenos, Basel 2006
 Yvette Z’Graggen: Lebenssplitter (fr. Eclats de vie). Lenos. Basel 2008
 Claire Krähenbühl: Ailleurs peut-être / Vielleicht anderswo. Poetry anthology 1991–2010. Wolfbach, Zurich 2013
 Pierre-Alain Tâche, Dire adieu / Abschied nehmen, Zurich, Wolfbach Verlag, 2017

External links 
Swiss National Library (NL)
 discussing and reading poetry in French with Slovenian translation by Brane Mozetič, Ljubljana, November 2009

References 

Markus Hediger at the International Poetry Festival of Rosario
Markus Hediger at the International Poetry Festival of Medellín
Markus Hediger at the International Poetry Festival of Lima

Swiss male poets
1959 births
Living people
Swiss translators
People from Kulm District
Writers from Zürich
University of Zurich alumni
20th-century Swiss poets
20th-century male writers